Jesurun Rak-Sakyi (born 5 October 2002) is an English professional footballer who plays as a winger or forward for League One club Charlton Athletic on loan from Crystal Palace.

Club career

Crystal Palace
Rak-Sakyi was originally in the youth system at Chelsea, before joining Crystal Palace in 2019. His first appearance in the Crystal Palace first-team squad was as an unused substitute against his previous club on 10 April 2021, and he signed his first professional contract for the club two days later.

He made his debut as a substitute in a 3–0 defeat against former club Chelsea on 14 August 2021 in the Premier League.

Charlton Athletic (loan)
On 11 August 2022, Rak-Sakyi joined Charlton Athletic on a season-long loan for the 2022–23 campaign. He made his debut for Charlton, aged 19, in a 5–1 League One win at home to Plymouth Argyle on 17 August 2022 where he scored the side's first goal. Ten days later, on 27 August 2022, Rak-Sakyi scored for Charlton again in a 1–1 League One draw away at Wycombe Wanderers.

International career
Though Rak-Sakyi is also eligible to represent Ghana through his parents, he accepted a call-up to the England U20 team in September 2021 to replace an injured Anthony Gordon. On 6 September 2021, he made a goalscoring debut for the U20s during a 6–1 victory over Romania U20s at St. George's Park.

Career statistics

References

External links
 

2002 births
Living people
Footballers from Southwark
English footballers
England youth international footballers
English sportspeople of Ghanaian descent
Association football midfielders
Chelsea F.C. players
Crystal Palace F.C. players
Charlton Athletic F.C. players
Premier League players
Black British sportspeople